Paid Back is a 1922 American silent melodrama film, directed by Irving Cummings. It stars Gladys Brockwell, Mahlon Hamilton, and Stuart Holmes, and was released on August 28, 1922.

Cast list
 Gladys Brockwell as Carol Gordon
 Mahlon Hamilton as David Hardy
 Stuart Holmes as Jack Gregory
 Lillian West as Dorothy Britton
 Kate Price as Carol's servant
 Edna Murphy as Eloise Hardy
 Arthur Stuart Hull as Jason Lockhart
 Wilfred Lucas as Ship captain

References

External links

Melodrama films
Films directed by Irving Cummings
Universal Pictures films
American silent feature films
American black-and-white films
Silent American drama films
1922 drama films
1922 films
1920s American films
1920s English-language films